Hosťová is a village and municipality in the Nitra District in western central Slovakia, in the Nitra Region.

History
In historical records, the village was first mentioned in 1232.

Geography
The village lies at an altitude of 200 metres and covers an area of 4.784 km². As of the 2011 census, it had a population 361 people.

Ethnicity
The village is approximately 231 (64%) Magyar and 108 (30%) Slovak.

Facilities
The village has a public library, a gym, and a football pitch.

See also
 List of municipalities and towns in Slovakia

References

Genealogical resources

The records for genealogical research are available at the state archive "Statny Archiv in Nitra, Slovakia"

 Roman Catholic church records (births/marriages/deaths): 1751-1911 (parish B)

External links
https://web.archive.org/web/20070513023228/http://www.statistics.sk/mosmis/eng/run.html
Surnames of living people in Hostova

Villages and municipalities in Nitra District